Jason Krog (born October 9, 1975) is a Canadian former professional ice hockey centre last contracted by Lørenskog IK in the Norwegian GET-ligaen (GET).

Playing career
A native of British Columbia, Krog began his junior career in the BCJHL with the Chilliwack Chiefs.  He played with the Chiefs for three seasons, culminating in a 128-point season in 1994–95.  The following season, he began a four-year tenure with the University of New Hampshire, notching 238 points (94 goals, 144 assists) in 152 games from 1995 to 1999. In 1998–99, Krog was awarded the Hobey Baker Award as the top collegiate hockey player.

Undrafted, he was signed as a free agent by the New York Islanders on May 14, 1999.  For three seasons, Krog mostly played in the American Hockey League with the Islanders' minor league affiliates.  In 2001–02, Krog finished second in team scoring on the Bridgeport Sound Tigers despite only playing in 64 games. In the playoffs, he accumulated 23 points in 20 games, helping Bridgeport to the Calder Cup Finals where they were defeated by the Chicago Wolves.

The following off-season, on July 17, 2002, he was signed by the Mighty Ducks of Anaheim as a free agent.  As a Duck he played 67 games in 2002–03 and posted career highs of 10 goals, 15 assists and 25 points.  In the playoffs, Krog played in 21 games as the Mighty Ducks made their way to the finals against the eventual Stanley Cup winners, the New Jersey Devils.

In 2003–04, he played a career-high 80 games with Anaheim before the NHL lockout suspended play the next season. After playing the lockout season with VSV EC of the Austrian Hockey League, tallying 60 points (27 goals, 33 assists) in 48 games, Krog remained in Europe the following season, signing with Genève-Servette HC of Switzerland's Nationalliga A and Frölunda Indians of the Swedish Elite League. He led Genève-Servette with 15 goals and placed second on the club in scoring despite playing in only 29 of their 44 games.
On July 4, 2006, Krog returned to the NHL as he was signed by the Atlanta Thrashers.  However, after 14 games in Atlanta, he was placed on waivers and picked up on January 12, 2007, by the New York Rangers. Krog played 9 games for the Rangers and he was later reclaimed by Atlanta on February 26.

After failing to make the Thrashers' team at the start of the 2007–08 season, Krog was sent down to their minor league affiliate, the Chicago Wolves, which gave Krog a chance to re-energize his career. After scoring 36 goals and 112 points, he captured the John B. Sollenberger Trophy as the league's top point scorer, the Willie Marshall Award as the top goal scorer and the Les Cunningham Award as league MVP. He led the Wolves to a divisional title and their second Calder Cup in seven years. Leading the playoffs in scoring, he also was awarded the Jack A. Butterfield Trophy as playoff MVP. His 26 assists tied the AHL record for the most in a single playoffs (shared with Bill McDougall, 1993; Domenic Pittis, 2000; and Rob Brown, 2002)
.

On July 11, 2008, he was signed as an unrestricted free agent by the Vancouver Canucks. However, on July 18, Krog and five other players were suspended by the International Ice Hockey Federation pending an investigation regarding simultaneous player contracts with both the NHL and the Russian Kontinental Hockey League.  Nevertheless, Krog began the season with the Canucks' AHL affiliate, the Manitoba Moose.  He was called up by Vancouver in light of injuries and scored his first goal as a Canuck on October 25, 2008, in a 6–3 win against the Edmonton Oilers.  On November 5, he was reassigned to the Manitoba Moose and finished the year to top score with 85 points and earning selection to the AHL's Second All-Star Team.

On July 3, 2009, he returned to the Atlanta Thrashers organization when he was signed as an unrestricted free agent to a two-year contract. After starting the 2009–10 season with their AHL affiliate, the Chicago Wolves, Krog was recalled to the Thrashers for two games as an offensive cover after losing Ilya Kovalchuk to injury but failed to appear in a game. On November 1, he was returned to the Wolves for the duration of the season, leading the team with 61 assists for 75 points.

From 2011 until 2014, he played for HV71 in SHL, After three seasons with HV71, on June 9, 2014, he signed a one-year contract, along with former Wolves and UNH teammate, Darren Haydar, in the Kontinental Hockey League with Croatian club, KHL Medveščak Zagreb. In the 2014–15 season, Krog recorded just 1 assist in 5 games before opting to leave the club. With Haydar following suit, they both signed a try-out contract with Austrian club, EC VSV, on October 2, 2014. After showing early scoring touch in Villach, Krog and Haydar both opted to remain signing a one-year contract on October 15, 2014.

Records
AHL record; most assists, single playoffs – 26 (2008) (shared with Bill McDougall, 1993; Domenic Pittis, 2000; and Rob Brown, 2002)

Career statistics

Awards and honours

References

External links

1975 births
Living people
Atlanta Thrashers players
Bridgeport Sound Tigers players
Canadian ice hockey centres
Canadian people of Norwegian descent
Canadian sportspeople of Japanese descent
Chicago Wolves players
Chilliwack Chiefs players
Cincinnati Mighty Ducks players
Dragons de Rouen players
Frölunda HC players
Genève-Servette HC players
Hobey Baker Award winners
HV71 players
Ice hockey people from British Columbia
KHL Medveščak Zagreb players
Lørenskog IK players
Lowell Lock Monsters players
Manitoba Moose players
Mighty Ducks of Anaheim players
New Hampshire Wildcats men's ice hockey players
New York Islanders players
New York Rangers players
People from Fernie, British Columbia
Providence Bruins players
Springfield Falcons players
Undrafted National Hockey League players
Vancouver Canucks players
EC VSV players
Canadian expatriate sportspeople in Norway
Canadian expatriate ice hockey players in Austria
Canadian expatriate ice hockey players in Croatia
Canadian expatriate ice hockey players in France
Canadian expatriate ice hockey players in Sweden
AHCA Division I men's ice hockey All-Americans